Ammatucha is a genus of snout moths. It was erected by Turner, in 1922, and is known from Australia, China, Sumatra, Bhutan and Nágas.

Species
 Ammatucha brevilepigera Ren & Li, 2006
 Ammatucha flavipalpa Ren & Li, 2006
 Ammatucha longilepigera Ren & Li, 2006
 Ammatucha piti Roesler, 1983
 Ammatucha porisada (Roesler & Küppers, 1979)
 Ammatucha semiirrorella (Hampson, 1896)

References

Phycitini
Pyralidae genera